Pelle Miljoona (Literally “Clown Million”), real name Petri Samuli Tiili (born 10 February 1955 in Hamina, Finland) is a Finnish punk rock musician,  who assembled his first band in 1977. His first single was Olen työtön (English: I am unemployed). His biggest hit was in 1980 with Moottoritie on Kuuma (English: The motorway is Hot). This is also the title of his best-known album. Members of the band playing on that album include Andy McCoy and Sam Yaffa. Another well-known song by one of his groups is Tahdon rakastella sinua (English: I Want to Make Love to You). This is usually considered to be Pelle Miljoona's song although it was sung by Tumppi Varonen, Pelle Miljoona on drums. Pelle Miljoona has had several bands, e.g. Pelle Miljoona & N.U.S, Pelle Miljoona, Pelle Miljoona & 1978, Pelle Miljoona & 1980, Pelle Miljoona Oy, Miljoonaliiga,  Pelle Miljoona & Linnunlaulu, Pelle Miljoona & Rockers, Pelle Miljoona Unabomber! and Pelle Miljoona United.

Pelle Miljoona has also written several novels and poetry collections.

References

External links
www.pellemiljoona.net 

1955 births
Living people
20th-century Finnish male singers
Punk rock singers
People from Hamina